Alexander Kuoppala (born 11 April 1974) is a Finnish musician. He was the guitarist for the Finnish heavy metal band Children of Bodom from 1995 to 2003. He played on their albums Something Wild, Hatebreeder, Follow the Reaper, and Hate Crew Deathroll. He also plays on the Timo Rautiainen album Sarvivuori.

Children of Bodom's first world tour began in 2003 and lasted until late 2004. The tour had many sold-out concerts and marked the consolidation of the band in North America, but was also accompanied by an unexpected announcement: Kuoppala decided to quit Children of Bodom for personal reasons right in the middle of the tour. Laiho's bandmate from Sinergy, Roope Latvala assumed the guitars as a session player, until later joining the band as Kuoppala's replacement.

In 2017 Alexander joined Finnish metal band Valonkantajat and recorded sologuitars on their last album "Vastavirtaan" in 2018. He played in Valonkantajat until 2021 when the band split up.

In 2019 he formed new band called Thyrargo. They started to record their first EP in 2020.

References

1974 births
Living people
Finnish heavy metal guitarists
Children of Bodom members
People from Espoo
Rhythm guitarists